Shurdington is a village near Cheltenham in Gloucestershire, England.  The area constitutes a civil parish within the Borough of Tewkesbury. It is located south of Cheltenham on the A46. The population at the 2011 census was 1,936
Shurdington has an 11th-century church (St. Paul's), a modern Social Centre (completed 1998) containing the Century Hall and Millennium Hall, a Primary School, a post office and general store and a hairdresser.  There are two public houses: the Bell Inn and The Cheese Rollers.  The latter is named for the annual cheeserolling event which takes place at nearby Cooper's Hill.

Governance
An electoral ward in the same name exists. The area of this ward and the population are identical to that of the parish.

Sports and recreation

Local community organisations include the 15th Cheltenham (Shurdington) Scout Group, the Cricket Club, and a Women's Institute.

Shurdington has one of the 471 King George's Fields as its recreation ground.

References

External links

Shurdington Village
Shurdington Primary School

Villages in Gloucestershire
Borough of Tewkesbury